Earl Mac Rauch is an American novelist and screenwriter.

Rauch is best known for writing the screenplays for A Stranger Is Watching; New York, New York and The Adventures of Buckaroo Banzai Across the 8th Dimension.

Bibliography
Dirty Pictures From the Prom (1969)
Arkansas Adios (1971)
New York, New York (1977)
Buckaroo Banzai (1984)
Buckaroo Banzai Against the World Crime League, et al: A Compendium of Evils (2021)

Filmography
New York, New York (1977) (with Mardik Martin)
A Stranger Is Watching (1982) (with Victor Miller)
The Adventures of Buckaroo Banzai Across the 8th Dimension (1984) (writer)
Wired (1989) (writer)

References

External links

20th-century American novelists
21st-century American novelists
American male novelists
American male screenwriters
Living people
20th-century American male writers
21st-century American male writers
Year of birth missing (living people)